These are The Official Charts Company UK Official Indie Chart number one hits of 1993.

See also
1993 in music

References

United Kingdom Indie Singles
Indie 1993
UK Indie Chart number-one singles